Igelfors is a locality situated in Finspång Municipality, Östergötland County, Sweden with 214 inhabitants in 2010.

See also
Igelfors Bruk

References 

Populated places in Östergötland County
Populated places in Finspång Municipality